The raspberry is the edible fruit of a multitude of plant species in the genus Rubus of the rose family, most of which are in the subgenus Idaeobatus. The name also applies to these plants themselves. Raspberries are perennial with woody stems. World production of raspberries in 2020 was 895,771 tonnes, led by Russia with 20% of the total.

Description 
A raspberry is an aggregate fruit, developing from the numerous distinct carpels of a single flower. What distinguishes the raspberry from its blackberry relatives is whether or not the torus (receptacle or stem) "picks with" (i.e., stays with) the fruit. When picking a blackberry fruit, the torus stays with the fruit. With a raspberry, the torus remains on the plant, leaving a hollow core in the raspberry fruit.

Raspberries are grown for the fresh fruit market and for commercial processing into individually quick frozen (IQF) fruit, purée, juice, or as dried fruit used in a variety of grocery products such as raspberry pie. Raspberries need ample sun and water for optimal development. Raspberries thrive in well-drained soil with a pH between 6 and 7 with ample organic matter to assist in retaining water. While moisture is essential, wet and heavy soils or excess irrigation can bring on Phytophthora root rot, which is one of the most serious pest problems facing the red raspberry. As a cultivated plant in moist, temperate regions, it is easy to grow and has a tendency to spread unless pruned. Escaped raspberries frequently appear as garden weeds, spread by seeds found in bird droppings.

An individual raspberry weighs , and is made up of around 100 drupelets, each of which consists of a juicy pulp and a single central seed. A raspberry bush can yield several hundred berries a year.

Etymology 
Raspberry derives its name from raspise, "a sweet rose-colored wine" (mid-15th century), from the Anglo-Latin vinum raspeys, or from raspoie, meaning "thicket", of Germanic origin. The name may have been influenced by its appearance as having a rough surface, related to Old English rasp or "rough berry".

Species 

Examples of raspberry species in Rubus subgenus Idaeobatus include:
 Rubus crataegifolius (Asian raspberry)
 Rubus gunnianus (Tasmanian alpine raspberry)
 Rubus idaeus (red raspberry or European red raspberry)
 Rubus leucodermis (whitebark raspberry or western raspberry, blue raspberry, black raspberry)
 Rubus occidentalis (black raspberry)
 Rubus parvifolius (Australian native raspberry)
 Rubus phoenicolasius (wine raspberry or wineberry)
 Rubus rosifolius (Mauritius raspberry)
 Rubus strigosus (American red raspberry) (syn. R. idaeus var. strigosus)
 Rubus ellipticus (yellow Himalayan raspberry)

Several species of Rubus, also called raspberries, are classified in other subgenera, including:
 Rubus deliciosus (boulder raspberry, subgenus Anoplobatus)
 Rubus odoratus (flowering raspberry, subgenus Anoplobatus)
 Rubus nivalis (snow raspberry, subgenus Chamaebatus)
 Rubus arcticus (Arctic raspberry, subgenus Cyclactis)
 Rubus sieboldii (Molucca raspberry, subgenus Malachobatus)

Cultivation 

Various kinds of raspberries can be cultivated from hardiness zones 3 to 9. Raspberries are traditionally planted in the winter as dormant canes, although planting of tender, plug plants produced by tissue culture has become much more common. A specialized production system called "long cane production" involves growing canes for a year in a northern climate such as Scotland or Oregon or Washington, where the chilling requirement for proper bud break is attained, or attained earlier than the ultimate place of planting. These canes are then dug, roots and all, to be replanted in warmer climates such as Spain, where they quickly flower and produce a very early season crop. Plants are typically planted 2–6 per m in fertile, well drained soil; raspberries are usually planted in raised beds/ridges, if there is any question about root rot problems.

All cultivars of raspberries have perennial roots, but many do not have perennial shoots. In fact, most raspberries have shoots that are biennial (meaning shoots grow in the first growing season and fruits grow on those shoots during the second growing season). The flowers can be a major nectar source for honeybees and other pollinators.

Raspberries are vigorous and can be locally invasive. They propagate using basal shoots (also known as suckers), extended underground shoots that develop roots and individual plants. They can sucker new canes some distance from the main plant. For this reason, raspberries spread well, and can take over gardens if left unchecked. Raspberries are often propagated using cuttings, and will root readily in moist soil conditions.

The fruit is harvested when it comes off the receptacle easily and has turned a deep color (red, black, purple, or golden yellow, depending on the species and cultivar). This is when the fruits are ripest and sweetest.

High tunnel bramble production offers the opportunity to bridge gaps in availability during late fall and late spring. Furthermore, high tunnels allow less hardy floricane-fruiting raspberries to overwinter in climates where they would not otherwise survive. In the tunnel plants are established at close spacing usually prior to tunnel construction.

Cultivars

Major cultivars 

Raspberries are an important commercial fruit crop, widely grown in all temperate regions of the world. Many of the most important modern commercial red raspberry cultivars derive from hybrids between R. idaeus and R. strigosus. Some botanists consider the Eurasian and American red raspberries to belong to a single, circumboreal species, Rubus idaeus, with the European plants then classified as either R. idaeus subsp. idaeus or R. idaeus var. idaeus, and the native North American red raspberries classified as either R. idaeus subsp. strigosus, or R. idaeus var. strigosus. Recent breeding has resulted in cultivars that are thornless and more strongly upright, not needing staking.

The black raspberry, Rubus occidentalis, is also cultivated, providing both fresh and frozen fruit, as well as jams, preserves, and other products, all with that species' distinctive flavor.

Purple raspberries have been produced by horticultural hybridization of red and black raspberries, and have also been found in the wild in a few places (for example, in Vermont) where the American red and the black raspberries both grow naturally. Commercial production of purple-fruited raspberries is rare.

Blue raspberry is a local name used in Prince Edward County, Ontario, Canada, for the cultivar 'Columbian', a hybrid (purple raspberry) of R. strigosus and R. occidentalis. Blue raspberry can also refer to the whitebark raspberry, R. leucodermis.

Fruits from such plants are called golden raspberries or yellow raspberries; despite their similar appearance, they retain the distinctive flavor of their respective species (red or black). Most pale-fruited raspberries commercially sold in the eastern United States are derivatives of red raspberries. Yellow-fruited variants of the black raspberry are sometimes grown in home gardens.

Red raspberries have also been crossed with various species in other subgenera of the genus Rubus, resulting in a number of hybrids, the first of which was the loganberry. Later notable hybrids include the olallieberry, boysenberry, marionberry, and tayberry; all are multi-generational hybrids. Hybridization between the familiar cultivated red raspberries and a few Asiatic species of Rubus has also been achieved.

Selected cultivars 
Numerous raspberry cultivars have been selected.

Two types of raspberry are available for commercial and domestic cultivation; the summer-bearing type produces an abundance of fruit on second-year canes (floricanes) within a relatively short period in midsummer, and double or "everbearing" plants, which also bear some fruit on first-year canes (primocanes) in the late summer and fall, as well as the summer crop on second-year canes. Those marked (AGM) have gained the Royal Horticultural Society's Award of Garden Merit.

Red, Early Summer fruiting 
 
 Boyne
 Fertödi Venus
 Rubin Bulgarski
 Cascade Dawn
 Glen Clova
 Glen Moy (AGM)
 Killarney
 Malahat
 Malling Exploit
 Malling Jewel (AGM) 
 Titan
 Willamette
 Prelude

Red, Mid-summer Fruiting 

 Cuthbert
 Glen Ample (AGM)
 Lloyd George
 Meeker
 Newburgh
 Ripley
 Skeena
 Cowichan
 Chemainus
 Saanich

Red, Late Summer Fruiting 

 Cascade Delight
 Coho
 Fertödi Rubina
 Glen Magna (AGM)
 Leo (AGM)
 Malling Admiral (AGM) 
 Octavia
 Schoenemann
 Tulameen (AGM)

Red primocane, Autumn fruiting 

 Amity
 Augusta
 Autumn Bliss (AGM)
 Joan J. (Thornless)
 Caroline
 Fertödi Kétszertermö
 Heritage
 Imara
 Joan J
 Josephine
 Kwanza
 Kweli
 Mapema
 Polka (AGM)
 Rafiki
 Ripley
 Summit
 Zeva Herbsternte

Yellow primocane, Autumn fruiting 

 Anne
 Fallgold
 Fertödi Aranyfürt
 Goldenwest
 Golden Queen
 Honey Queen
 Jambo
 Kiwi Gold

Purple 

 Brandywine
 Glencoe
 Royalty

Black 

 Black Hawk
 Bristol
 Cumberland
 Jewel
 Munger
 Ohio Everbearer
 Scepter

Dwarf cultivars 
  = 'Nr7'

Diseases and pests 
Raspberries are sometimes eaten by the larvae of some Lepidoptera species (butterflies and moths). More serious are the raspberry beetle (in Europe) and the raspberry fruitworm (in North America), whose larvae can damage raspberries.

Botrytis cinerea, or gray mold, is a common fungal infection of raspberries and other soft fruit under wet conditions. It is seen as a gray mold growing on the raspberries, and particularly affects fruit which are bruised, as it provides an easy entrance point for the spores.

Raspberry plants should not be planted where potatoes, tomatoes, peppers, eggplants, or bulbs have previously been grown, without prior fumigation of the soil. These crops are hosts for the disease Verticillium wilt, a fungus that can stay in the soil for many years and can infest the raspberry crop.

Production 
In 2020, world production of raspberries was 895,771 tonnes, led by Russia with 20% of the world total (table). Other major producers were Mexico, Poland, Serbia, and the United States.

Nutrition 

Raw raspberries are 86% water, 12% carbohydrates, and have about 1% each of protein and fat (table). In a 100 gram amount, raspberries supply 53 kilocalories and 6.5 grams of dietary fiber. Raspberries are a rich source (20% or more of the Daily Value, DV) of vitamin C (32% DV), manganese (32% DV) and dietary fiber (26% DV), but otherwise have low content of micronutrients (table). Raspberries are a low-glycemic index food, with total sugar content of only 4% and no starch.

The aggregate fruit structure contributes to raspberry's nutritional value, as it increases the proportion of dietary fiber, which is among the highest known in whole foods, up to 6% fiber per total weight.

Phytochemicals 
Raspberries contain phytochemicals, such as anthocyanin pigments, ellagic acid, ellagitannins, quercetin, gallic acid, cyanidins, pelargonidins, catechins, kaempferol and salicylic acid. Yellow raspberries and others with pale-colored fruits are lower in anthocyanin content. Both yellow and red raspberries contain carotenoids, mostly lutein esters, but these are masked by anthocyanins in red raspberries.

Raspberry compounds are under preliminary research for their potential to affect human health.

Leaves 
Raspberry leaves can be used fresh or dried in herbal teas, providing an astringent flavor. In herbal and traditional medicine, raspberry leaves are used for some remedies, although there is no scientifically valid evidence to support their medicinal use.

Comparison

See also 

 Blue raspberry flavor
 Chambord (liqueur)
 Framboise
 List of culinary fruits
 Raspberry ketone
 Raspberry juice
 Red raspberry leaf (herb)
 Thimbleberry

References

Further reading 
 Funt, R.C. / Hall, H.K. (2012). Raspberries (Crop Production Science in Horticulture). CABI.

External links 

 
 
 Raspberries & More (University of Illinois Extension)

 
Berries
Plant common names
Rubus

de:Rubus
sv:Hallon